The 1999 Toyota Princess Cup singles was the tennis singles event of the third edition of the first hardcourt tournament after the US Open. Monica Seles was the two-time defending champion, but was defeated by Lindsay Davenport in the final to win the title.

Seeds

Draw

Finals

Top half

Bottom half

Qualifying

Seeds

Qualifiers

Lucky losers

Qualifying draw

First qualifier

Second qualifier

Third qualifier

Fourth qualifier

References
 ITF singles results page

Singles
Toyota Princess Cup - Singles